Tomas Backman (born 1980) is a Swedish football player who plays for Tenhults IF. Prior to that, he has played for Kubbe/Norrflärke IF, Anundsjö IF, Friska Viljor FC, Djurgårdens IF, GIF Sundsvall and Östers IF. He joined Öster in 2006 on a loan contract from Djurgården. After his spell in Östers IF, he chose to play for Jönköpings Södra IF in early 2007. He primarily plays as a full back but can also play as a midfielder.

Honours

Club 

 Djurgårdens IF
 Svenska Cupen (2): 2004, 2005

External links

1980 births
Living people
Allsvenskan players
Östers IF players
GIF Sundsvall players
Djurgårdens IF Fotboll players
Swedish footballers
Jönköpings Södra IF players
Association football midfielders